The Taylors Lakes Football Club, nicknamed the Lions or colloquially the Lakers, is an Australian rules football club located in Taylors Lakes, Victoria, north west of Melbourne. The club originated in 1989 with the intention to field junior sides, and in 1991 affiliated with the Essendon District Football League at a senior level. The club has competed in the league since 1993, and today fields teams in Division 1 and Division 1 Reserves, as well as a number of junior squads.

The club's home games are held at Lionheart Reserves, which also houses the club's administrative headquarters.

History
The Lions reached their first grand final in 2008, with a reserves team securing the Essendon District Football League (EDFL) B Grade Reserves premiership. In 2010, the club's senior and reserve teams qualified for their respective grand finals, with the senior team defeating  16.14 (110) to 10.12 (72). This saw the side promoted from B Grade to A Grade for the 2011 season, but would ultimately be relegated into a restructured Division 1 from 2012 onwards.

The club's reserve side has had continued success, winning four consecutive grand finals between 2014 and 2017.

In January 2019, former Avondale Heights player Charles Cuzzupi was announced as the Lions' new senior coach.

Honours

VFL/AFL players from Taylors Lakes Football Club
 Robert Stevenson
 Mark Blicavs

Tyson Greenwood Bendigo Bombers / Essendon 2006/2011 played 46 games 28 goals

References

External links
 

Essendon District Football League clubs
1989 establishments in Australia
Australian rules football clubs established in 1989
Australian rules football clubs in Melbourne
Sport in the City of Brimbank